Casey Fitzgerald (born December 11, 1985) is a former American football player.  He grew up in Red Oak, Texas, and played college football, initially as a walk-on, for North Texas Mean Green football team from 2005 to 2008.  In 12 games during the 2007 season, he caught 111 passes for 1,322 yards and 12 touchdowns.  He ranked third in the NCAA and first in the Sun Belt Conference in receptions during the 2007 season.  In a 2007 game against SMU, he totaled 327 receiving yards, the fifth highest in NCAA history to that date.  In 12 games during the 2008 season, he caught 113 passes for 1,119 yards and six touchdowns. He led the NCAA major colleges that year in total offense and ranked second in passing yards. He led the NCAA in receptions and led the Sun Belt Conference in receiving yards in 2008.

See also
 List of NCAA major college football yearly receiving leaders

References

American football wide receivers
North Texas Mean Green football players
Living people
1985 births
Place of birth missing (living people)